The Fat River is a river in northwestern Kenora District in northwestern Ontario, Canada. It is in the Hudson Bay drainage basin and is a right tributary of the Fawn River.

The Fat River begins at an unnamed lake and flows north to its mouth at the Fawn River. The Fawn River flows via the Severn River to Hudson Bay.

References

Sources

Rivers of Kenora District